Alan Bennett Krueger (September 17, 1960 – March 16, 2019) was an American economist who was the James Madison Professor of Political Economy at Princeton University and Research Associate at the National Bureau of Economic Research. He served as Assistant Secretary of the Treasury for Economic Policy, nominated by President Barack Obama, from May 2009 to October 2010, when he returned to Princeton. He was nominated in 2011 by Obama as chair of the White House Council of Economic Advisers, and served in that office from November 2011 to August 2013. He was among the 50 highest ranked economists in the world according to Research Papers in Economics.

Early life and education 
Krueger grew up in a Jewish family in Livingston, New Jersey, and graduated from Livingston High School in 1979.

Krueger received his B.S. from the Cornell University School of Industrial and Labor Relations (with honors), and he received his A.M. and Ph.D. in Economics from Harvard University in 1985 and 1987, respectively.

Career 
Krueger began teaching at Princeton University in 1987, and successively held the Bendheim Professorship in Economics and Public Affairs and the James Madison Professorship in Political Economy.

Krueger developed and applied the method of natural experiments to study the effect of education on earnings, the minimum wage on employment, and other issues.

Krueger compared restaurant jobs in New Jersey, which raised its minimum wage, to restaurant jobs in Pennsylvania, which did not, and found that restaurant employment in New Jersey increased, while it decreased in Pennsylvania. The results reinvigorated the academic debate on the employment effects of minimum wages and spawned a large literature.

His books, Education Matters: Selected Essays by Alan B. Krueger and (with James Heckman) Inequality in America: What Role for Human Capital Policies? reviewed the available research relating to positive externalities accruing to society from increased government investment in educating the children of the poor. In Inequality in America, he writes:

In his book, What Makes a Terrorist: Economics and the Roots of Terrorism (2007), he wrote that in contrast to the assumption that terrorists come from impoverished, uneducated environments, terrorists often come from middle-class, college-educated backgrounds.

In 1994–95, he served as Chief Economist at the United States Department of Labor. He received the Kershaw Prize, Mahalanobis Prize, and IZA Prize (with David Card), and was a fellow of the American Academy of Arts and Sciences, Society of Labor Economists, Econometric Society and American Academy of Political and Social Science. He was a member of the Executive and Supervisory Committee (ESC) of CERGE-EI, an academic institution located in Prague, Czech Republic.

On March 7, 2009, he was nominated by President Barack Obama to be Assistant Secretary of the Treasury for Economic Policy. In October 2010, he announced his resignation from the Treasury Department, to return to Princeton University.

On August 29, 2011, he was nominated by Obama to be chair of the White House Council of Economic Advisers, and on November 3, 2011, the Senate unanimously confirmed his nomination.

He also published several books on issues related to education, labor markets and income distribution. He was also known for his work on the Environmental Kuznets Curve. Between 2000 and 2006 he wrote for The New York Times Economic Scene column.

Uber paid Krueger about $100,000 in 2015 to write in support of its job-creation model.

Krueger signed a 2018 amici curiae brief that expressed support for Harvard University in the Students for Fair Admissions v. President and Fellows of Harvard College lawsuit.

Personal life 
Krueger was married to Lisa Simon and had two children.

Death and legacy
Krueger was found dead at his home in Princeton on March 16, 2019. His family stated the cause of death was suicide. In a statement, former President Obama declared: "Alan was someone who was deeper than numbers on a screen and charts on a page," adding, "He saw economic policy not as a matter of abstract theories, but as a way to make people's lives better." His death was commemorated by The Economist with a full-page obituary running in their Free Exchange column.

David Card, co-author with Krueger of their influential 1994 paper on the effect of raising the minimum wage, stated that it was "unambiguously clear" that if Krueger were still alive, he would have shared in Card's 2021 Nobel Memorial Prize in Economic Sciences.

Books

References

External links 

Home page
New York Times Economic Scene Columns
IDEAS/RePEc

|-

1960 births
2019 deaths
21st-century American politicians
Chief Economists of the United States Department of Labor
Cornell University School of Industrial and Labor Relations alumni
Environmental economists
Fellows of the Econometric Society
Harvard University alumni
Jewish American members of the Cabinet of the United States
Labor economists
Education economists
Microeconometricians
Obama administration cabinet members
Livingston High School (New Jersey) alumni
People from Livingston, New Jersey
Princeton University faculty
United States Assistant Secretaries of the Treasury
Fellows of the American Academy of Arts and Sciences
National Bureau of Economic Research
Economists from New Jersey
Writers from New Jersey
21st-century American economists
Suicides in New Jersey
2019 suicides
Chairs of the United States Council of Economic Advisers